Tygart Valley Homesteads Historic District is a national historic district located near Dailey, Randolph County, West Virginia.  It encompasses 337 contributing buildings, three contributing sites, and three contributing structures, associated with a resettlement community established during the Great Depression by the Roosevelt administration.  It was the largest of the three resettlement communities in West Virginia, the others being Arthurdale and Eleanor.  The first dwellings were constructed in 1934, and the Civilian Conservation Corps built the public water system, draining systems, and culverts.  The houses have modest Colonial Revival architecture details and have either a side gable or gambrel roof, referred to as either an "A-Frame" or "Barn House."  Other notable buildings include the Dailey Community Center (1937), gas station (1940), The Homestead School (1939), The East Dailey Bridge (1938), Community Farm, The Warehouse (c. 1935–1936), The Woodworking Shop (c. 1935–1936), and The Weaving Shop (c. 1934).

It was listed on the National Register of Historic Places in 2004.

See also
Tygart Valley River

References

External links
 
 The Tygart Valley Homestead at the Traveling 219 project website at the Internet Archive

Civilian Conservation Corps in West Virginia
New Deal subsistence homestead communities
National Register of Historic Places in Randolph County, West Virginia
Historic districts in Randolph County, West Virginia
Colonial Revival architecture in West Virginia
Historic districts on the National Register of Historic Places in West Virginia